Route 205 is a state highway in eastern Connecticut, running from the village of Wauregan in Plainfield to the town center of Brooklyn.

Route description

Route 205 begins at an intersection with Route 12 in the village of Wauregan in the north western corner of the town of Plainfield. In Brooklyn, it continues northwest through the southeastern part of town until its end at an intersection with Route 169 in the town center of Brooklyn. Route 205 is known as Wauregan Road for its entire length.

History
In 1922, the road connecting the village of Wauregan and Brooklyn center was designated as a primary state highway known as Highway 144. Highway 144 was renumbered to Route 205 as part of the 1932 state highway renumbering. The route had no major changes since, other than a partial realignment in Brooklyn in 1999.

Junction list

References

External links

205
Transportation in Windham County, Connecticut